The 2016 Nana Trophy was a professional tennis tournament played on outdoor clay courts. It was the fifth edition of the tournament and part of the 2016 ITF Women's Circuit, offering a total of $50,000 in prize money. It took place in Tunis, Tunisia, on 2–8 May 2016.

Singles main draw entrants

Seeds 

 1 Rankings as of 25 April 2016.

Other entrants 
The following players received wildcards into the singles main draw:
  Fiona Codino
  Dea Herdželaš
  Yasmine Mansouri
  Sandra Samir

The following players received entry from the qualifying draw:
  Maria Marfutina
  Pemra Özgen
  Nadia Podoroska
  Patty Schnyder

Champions

Singles

 Ons Jabeur def.  Romina Oprandi, 1–6, 6–2, 6–2

Doubles

 Arina Rodionova /  Valeriya Strakhova def.  Irina Khromacheva /  İpek Soylu, 6–1, 6–2

External links 
 2016 Nana Trophy at ITFtennis.com

2016 ITF Women's Circuit
2016 in Tunisian sport
Tennis tournaments in Tunisia